Mounir Lazzez (born November 16, 1987) is a Tunisian mixed martial artist who competes in the Welterweight division of the Ultimate Fighting Championship. A professional fighter since 2012, he is the first fighter that was born and raised in an Arab country to be signed to the UFC.

Background 
Originally born in the major port town of Sfax in the South East of Tunisia, it was Mounir Lazzez highlights that lead to him being the first fighter that was born and raised in an Arab country to be signed to the UFC. Indeed, it was after Dana White watched Mounir Lazzez highlights whilst sitting in a restaurant that he was so impressed that he decided to sign him to the UFC. A friend of Lazzez had recognized the UFC president Dana White at a restaurant in Las Vegas in the United States of America and took the opportunity to show Mounir Lazzez highlights to him, and White being immediately impressed by the footage took the next steps to sign him to the UFC as soon as possible.

He started MMA classes at the age of 15 in Tunisia, when his parents decided to put him in martial arts because he was being bullied. After competing on the regional and national level, he moved to Canada to focus on his wrestling, spending from 2009 until 2011 there until a business opportunity lured him to Dubai.

Mixed martial arts career 
Lazzez made his professional debut in 2012 and compiled a 9–1 record fighting for a variety of Middle Eastern promotions, most notably Brave Combat Federation, where he competed for the Super Lightweight title, losing the fight unanimous decision to Eldar Eldarov.

Ultimate Fighting Championship

Lazzez faced Abdul Razak Alhassan on July 16, 2020 at UFC on ESPN: Kattar vs. Ige. At the weigh-ins, Alhassan weighed in at 174 pounds, 3 pounds over the welterweight non-title fight limit. He was fined 20% of his purse which went to Lazzez and the bout proceeded at catchweight. He won the fight via unanimous decision. This fight earned him the Fight of the Night bonus.

Lazzez, as a replacement for Christian Aguilera, faced Warlley Alves on January 20, 2021 at UFC on ESPN: Chiesa vs. Magny. He lost the fight via first round TKO.

Lazzez was scheduled to face Niklas Stolze on July 31, 2021 at UFC on ESPN: Hall vs. Strickland. However, Lazzez pulled out just a few days before the event due to visa issues and was replaced by Jared Gooden.

Lazzez was scheduled to face Elizeu Zaleski dos Santos on April 16, 2022 at UFC on ESPN: Luque vs. Muhammad 2. However, Zaleski dos Santos withdrew the week of the fight and was replaced by Ange Loosa. He won the fight via unanimous decision.

Lazzez faced Gabriel Bonfim on January 21, 2023 at UFC 283. He lost the fight via a guillotine choke submission in the first round.

Championships and awards

Mixed martial arts
 Ultimate Fighting Championship
 Fight of the Night (One time) 
Desert Force Championship 
Desert Force Welterweight Championship (One Time)

Personal life

Association with Daniel Kinahan 
Lazzez is reportedly close to Irish reputed gang boss and boxing promoter Daniel Kinahan, and praised him during his post fight octagon and media interview at UFC on ESPN: Luque vs. Muhammad 2. Kinahan is from Dublin, and is allegedly a senior figure in an international crime syndicate, the Kinahan Cartel, with criminal activities  including drugs and firearm smuggling. Kinahan has been sanctioned by the United States government, who have offered a $5 million reward for key information on Kinahan and his brother and father.

Mixed martial arts record

|-
|Loss
|align=center|11–3
|Gabriel Bonfim
|Submission (guillotine choke)
|UFC 283
|
|align=center|1
|align=center|0:49
|Rio de Janeiro, Brazil
|
|-
|Win
|align=center|11–2
|Ange Loosa
|Decision (unanimous)
|UFC on ESPN: Luque vs. Muhammad 2 
|
|align=center|3
|align=center|5:00
|Las Vegas, Nevada, United States
|
|-
|Loss
|align=center|10–2
|Warlley Alves
|TKO (body kicks and punches)
|UFC on ESPN: Chiesa vs. Magny 
|
|align=center|1
|align=center|2:35
|Abu Dhabi, United Arab Emirates
|
|-
|Win
|align=center|10–1
|Abdul Razak Alhassan
|Decision (unanimous)
|UFC on ESPN: Kattar vs. Ige
|
|align=center|3
|align=center|5:00
|Abu Dhabi, United Arab Emirates
|
|-
|Win
|align=center|9–1 
|Arber Murati	
|TKO (knees and punches)
|Probellum MMA Dubai: Lazzez vs. Murati
|
|align=center| 1
|align=center| 0:59
|Dubai, United Arab Emirates
|
|-
|Win
|align=center|8–1 
|Sasha Palatnikov
|TKO (elbows and punches)
|UAE Warriors 8
||
|align=center|1
|align=center|4:48
|Abu Dhabi, United Arab Emirates
|
|-
|Loss
|align=center|7–1 
|Eldar Eldarov
|Decision (unanimous)
|Brave CF 23
|
|align=center| 5
|align=center| 5:00
|Amman, Jordan
|
|-
| Win
| align=center| 7–0
| Dmitrijs Homjakovs
| TKO
| Brave CF 16
| 
| align=center| 2
| align=center| 4:15
| Abu Dhabi, United Arab Emirates
| 
|-
| Win
| align=center| 6–0
| Christophe Van Dijck
| Decision (unanimous)
| Phoenix Fighting Championship 4: Dubai
| 
| align=center| 3
| align=center| 5:00
| Dubai, United Arab Emirates
| 
|-
| Win
| align=center| 5–0
| Mohamad Ghorabi
| TKO (punches)
| Desert Force 16
| 
| align=center| 2
| align=center| 3:50
| Riyadh, Saudi Arabia
| 
|-
| Win
| align=center| 4–0
| Amr Fathee Wahman
| KO (head kick)
| Desert Force 11
| 
| align=center| 1
| align=center| 2:00
| Manama, Bahrain
| 
|-
| Win
| align=center| 3–0
| Anas Siraj Mounir
| KO (head kick)
| Desert Force 10
| 
| align=center| 3
| align=center| 1:15
| Amman, Jordan
| 
|-
| Win
| align=center| 2–0
| Ashkan Mehrdadpoor
| TKO (punches)
| Dubai FC 3
| 
| align=center| 1
| align=center|	2:25
| Dubai, United Arab Emirates
| 
|-
| Win
| align=center| 1–0
| Andrew Connor
| KO (punch)
| Dubai FC 2
| 
| align=center| 1
| align=center| 0:54
| Dubai, United Arab Emirates
|

See also 
 List of male mixed martial artists
 List of current UFC fighters

References

External links 
 
  
 

Living people
1987 births
Tunisian male mixed martial artists
Welterweight mixed martial artists
Mixed martial artists utilizing wrestling
Ultimate Fighting Championship male fighters